Kadhal Kadhai, also known as Velu Prabhakaranin Kadhal Kadhai,  is a 2009 Indian Tamil language erotic romantic drama film written and directed by Velu Prabhakaran. The film stars Velu Prabhakaran, Shirley Das, Preity Rangayani, Babilona, and Stefi, with Jai Rathan, Adhiroopan, Sampath Ram, Srilekha, Saakshi Siva, and Suruli Manohar playing supporting roles. The film, produced by J. Satish Kumar, had music by Ilaiyaraaja. After years of struggle with the censor board, the film was released on 17 July 2009 amid a controversy over its adult content. The film was also dubbed into Telugu as Manmadhulu. In 2017, Velu Prabhakaran married Shirley Das.

Plot
Film director Velu Prabhakaran has directed a controversial film containing nudity, and the censor board banned the release of the film; thus, Velu Prabhakaran is caught in legal battles to release the film. One day, after a court hearing, goons attack Velu Prabhakaran, and he is rushed to the hospital in a serious condition. The police investigate the murder attempt and a female journalist (Stefi) who has recently interviewed Velu Prabhakaran is interrogated by the police. A few days ago, Velu Prabhakaran told her the story of his film who was about three women - Raani (Shirley Das), Thangam (Preity Rangayani) and Saroja (Babilona) - who hailed from the village Vishnupuram. The three women have one common issue: lust.

Vishnupuram is affected by the communal riots that frequently break out between upper-caste people and lower-caste people. During a riot, the lower-caste girl Raani is saved by the upper-caste boy named Sakthi (Jai Rathan), and they then fall in love with each other. Sakthi is the son of the heartless caste leader Reddiar, while Raani is the niece of the brute Karuppaiah (Sampath Ram). Reddiar and Karuppaiah are archenemies. A bachelor school teacher (Adhiroopan) falls under the spell of his maid Thangam, a poor single mother. Thangam was dumped by her boyfriend after she was pregnant by him; therefore, Thangam was rejected by her brother Pazhani and sister-in-law Saroja. One day, the teacher gives Thangam a glass of milk mixed with sleeping pills and rapes her in her sleep. The teacher then promises to marry Thangam but later announces to her that his family arranged his wedding with a woman of his caste. Feeling betrayed by a man for the second time, Thangam spits on his face, and he leaves the village. Saroja, who would do anything for money, has an affair with Reddiar. One day, Pazhani caught Saroja sleeping with Reddiar, and Reddiar brutally kills him.

After telling the story, Velu Prabhakaran shared with the journalist his troubled love life and the reason which prompted to direct this film. Back to the present, the police arrest the culprit: Velu Prabhakaran's ex-wife. She wanted to hide her previous marriage from her new husband so she hired goons to kill him.

A few months later, Velu Prabhakaran, now healed, meets the journalist and tells her the climax of his film. The young lovers decided to elope, but Reddiar catches the young lovers and beheads Raani. In turn, his son Sakthi murders him. The journalist then proposes her love to Velu Prabhakaran. He tells her that he does not believe in love, but he believes in lust.

Cast

Velu Prabhakaran as himself
Shirley Das as Raani
Preity Rangayani as Thangam
Babilona as Saroja
Stefi as Journalist
Jai Rathan as Sakthi
Sampath Ram as Karuppaiah
Adhiroopan as Teacher
Srilekha as Raani's mother
Saakshi Siva as Police Inspector
Suruli Manohar
Sundar
Poochi Senthil
Aavadi Manoharan
Anbu Thennarasu

Production
Velu Prabhakaran began work on the production of a film titled Kadhal Arangam in October 2003, writing the story, screenplay and dialogue for the project. Velu Prabhakaran revealed that the film would expose the falsehood of kama in society, though he later gave directorial credits of the film to his brother Velu Raja. The film also takes on the prevailing caste system and explores sexuality. Thus, the censors were not willing to give it a certificate due to objectionable scenes and an ongoing battle with the censor board emerged in December 2004. In November 2006, Velu Prabhakaran held an emotional appeal at a press conference stating that "Suppression is what causes a lot of sex crimes. That is not so in western countries, that's why they don't make a big deal about displaying the body. Here, just the lack of a davani has the audience all agog". In 2009, the team finally agreed to tone down the scenes and mute certain dialogues and to compromise with the censors the film, they changed the title from Kadhal Arangam to Kadhal Kadhai. The director had reportedly inserted a few elements from this story of his life into the film and in the title credits of the film, Velu Prabhakaran included an extended scene which narrates his opinions and difficulties of the way the film released; while he also played the role of a film director in the venture, noting that parts were autobiographical.

Soundtrack

The music was composed by Ilaiyaraaja, with lyrics written by Muthulingam and Mu. Metha.

Release
The film was released on 17 July 2009 alongside Achchamundu! Achchamundu! and Vedigundu Murugesan.

Critical reception
The film mostly received negative reviews upon release. Indiaglitz stated, "The film takes a highly moral stance against exploitation of a woman's physique. But sadly, the movie is full of the exploitation of not one, but three women". A critic said, "Prabhakaranin's ‘Kadhal Kadhai’ is a film meant for absent-minded sex maniacs who can get gratified with their inner feelings watching this X-rated flick". Behindwoods.com rated the film 0 out of 5 and wrote, "If you must watch Kaadhal Kadhai, we would advise you not to tell home. You wouldn't want a dent in your morality or worst, sanity, would you?". A critic from Bharatstudent rated the film 1 out of 5 and said, "More than documentary, less than porn film, please don't watch it".

Box office
The film took a good opening thanks to some steamy scenes and ended up as an average grosser at the Chennai box office. Despite being average grosser at the box-office, the film was dubbed into Telugu as Manmadhulu and released on 4 December 2009 by producer V. Suresh Chowdary.

References

External links
 

2009 films
2000s Tamil-language films
Indian erotic drama films
Indian romantic drama films
Films about sexuality
Films about film directors and producers
Films about filmmaking
Indian nonlinear narrative films
Obscenity controversies in film
Films scored by Ilaiyaraaja
Films directed by Velu Prabhakaran
2000s erotic drama films
Indian erotic romance films
2009 romantic drama films